The Allegheny County Police can mean any of the following:

 Allegheny County Police Department of Allegheny County, Pennsylvania
 The defunct Allegany County Bureau of Police of Allegany County, Maryland